This is a list of A-37B Dragonfly squadrons of the United States Air Force. 

Cessna Aircraft built a total of 577 A-37B's. The aircraft was used for a relatively short period by the USAF; however, many aircraft had long service lives flying for the Air Force Reserves and Air National Guard.   Aircraft were manufactured by from 1967–1973 for USAF use; afterwards 1974–1975 for Military Assistance Program (MAP) sales primarily to South Vietnam and Latin American Air Forces.

The OA-37B Dragonfly variant was an armed observation aircraft developed during the Vietnam War. The "Dragonfly" replaced the aging Cessna O-2 Skymaster in the early 1980s. It continued in service with Air National Guard and Reserve units as an observation platform, until the 1980s.

Aircraft used by the USAF in South Vietnam were turned over to the Republic of Vietnam Air Force (VNAF) in 1972 after the USAF withdrawal as part of the "Vietnamization" program.  On 28 April 1975, in the last days of the war, three VNAF A-37s captured by the North Vietnamese at Phan Rang AB attacked the VNAF-controlled Tan Son Nhut AB; approximately 95 serviceable aircraft wound up in the hands of the North Vietnamese after the South Vietnamese collapse in 1975.  A-37s were used by the Vietnam People's Air Force for many years.  When Vietnam invaded Cambodia in 1979, former VNAF A-37s flew most of the ground support missions and were a part of the VPAF until finally being grounded in the early 1990s.  Some were put on static display in Vietnam, and 10 were auctioned in 1998.  Those sold are currently owned by private companies, and individuals in America, Australia, New Zealand, and Europe.

Active Duty Squadrons

Air Force Reserve Squadrons

Air National Guard Squadrons

References

 Darling, Ken (2005), Tweet and the Dragonfly The Story of the Cessna A-37 and T-37, Lulu.com 
 Martin, Patrick. Tail Code: The Complete History of USAF Tactical Aircraft Tail Code Markings. Schiffer Military Aviation History, 1994. .
 Mueller, Robert, Air Force Bases Volume I, Active Air Force Bases Within the United States of America on 17 September 1982, Office of Air Force History, 1989
 Ravenstein, Charles A. Air Force Combat Wings Lineage and Honors Histories, 1947–1977. Maxwell AFB, Alabama: Office of Air Force History, 1984. .

External links

A-37, USAF squadrons
Cessna A-37, USAF
Cessna A-37, USAF